Martin Konečný (born 6 August 1984) is a Czech male artistic gymnast and part of the national team.  He is 2006 European championships floors bronze medalist.

He participated at the 2012 Summer Olympics in London, United Kingdom.

References

1984 births
Living people
Czech male artistic gymnasts
Gymnasts at the 2008 Summer Olympics
Gymnasts at the 2012 Summer Olympics
Olympic gymnasts of the Czech Republic
Gymnasts from Prague
European Games competitors for the Czech Republic
Gymnasts at the 2015 European Games